Lacus Temporis (Latin temporis, Lake of Time) is a small lunar mare that is located in the northeastern quadrant of the Moon's near side.

This small mare is composed of two large, roughly circular patches of relatively smooth surface, with a pair of small, cup-shaped craters located prominently at their intersection. Both of these regions of basaltic lava covered surface have some smaller side lobes, which are most likely impact features that have become flooded. 

Just to the southwest of this feature is the crater Chevallier and to the southeast lies Carrington.

See also
Volcanism on the Moon

Temporis